The Filmfare Best Actress Award is given by the Filmfare magazine as part of its annual Filmfare Awards East for Bangla films. The awards were extended to "Best Actress" in 1974. The year indicates the year in which the awards were presented.

Superlatives

Aparna Sen is the most awarded recipient of this category with four wins, followed by Swastika Mukherjee with three and Jaya Ahsan with two respectively.

Winners and nominees

1970s

1980s

2010s

References

Notes

Filmfare Awards
Film awards for lead actress